The West Bengal National University of Juridical Sciences (WBNUJS or NUJS) is a National Law University located in Bidhannagar, Kolkata, West Bengal, India. In 2021, it was ranked fourth among law colleges in India by National Institutional Ranking Framework and second by India Today. It comes under the exclusive chancellorship and purview of the Chief Justice of India.

The university was one of the first law universities to offer a five-year integrated B.A. LLB (Hons.) degree program, and an LLM program. Admission to the B.A. LLB degree program is through the Common Law Admission Test, a highly competitive, nationwide entrance examination, held jointly by the national law schools. NUJS also offers MPhil, Ph.D., and diplomas in business laws and other programs, in addition to a number of online courses.

NUJS was established in 1999 by the Bar Council of India (BCI), with the government of West Bengal. The Founder-Vice-Chancellor was Professor N.R. Madhava Menon, a former Professor of law at Delhi University, and Founder-Director, National Law School of India University (NLSIU), Bangalore, who is credited with revolutionising the field of legal education in India, by starting the concept of "national law schools", as opposed to the traditional law colleges prevalent before.

The NUJS, along with NLSIU, remain the only two national law schools that have the honourable Chief Justice of India as the Chancellor.

Chief Minister Jyoti Basu helped improve the university. Other aspects of the university that was worked on, include Sh. Jyoti Basu, the former Chief Minister of West Bengal who was a Middle Temple barrister; Sh. Somnath Chatterjee, a former Speaker of the Lok Sabha, also a Middle Temple barrister and a leading member of the Calcutta Bar Library; and Justice Chittotosh Mookerjee, a former Chief Justice of the Calcutta High Court and the Bombay High Court and the Acting Governor of Maharashtra. Justice Mookerjee was the university's Honorary Treasurer and has been associated with the university's work since its inception in 1999. The NUJS is an autonomous university.

Initially, classes, which started in 2000, were held at Aranya Bhavan, where the Environment Ministry of the government of West Bengal is located, and the first batches of students started living in government flats. On 28 October 2002, the university's present-day permanent campus was inaugurated by the then Chief Justice of India, B. N. Kirpal. In 2006, NUJS was allotted a  plot in Rajarhat, an upscale township, which is being developed by the West Bengal government.

Campus

Hostels

The Salt Lake Campus consists of an academic block and three residential blocks. The latter comprises two, seven-storied halls of residence for girls and boys, and a double-storied faculty accommodation house-cum-guest house. The university's academic block, christened after B.R. Ambedkar, is a four-storied octagonal structure that opens inwardly to a lawn. The building houses classrooms, a library and reading room, two conference halls, offices and an auditorium.

NUJS's main campus is located on a  plot in Salt Lake City, overseeing the Eastern Metropolitan Bypass. The National Institute of Fashion Technology  and the College of Leather Technology border the Campus. 
NUJS's Rajarhat Campus is yet to be built. No significant construction has been undertaken and the land lies vacant.

Admission to the hostels is conducted simultaneously with admission to the university.

Canteen
The university has a canteen which is run by Little Sisters, a catering service that also serves the Indian Railway Traffic Service.

Sports facilities
The Salt Lake Campus has limited sports facilities and the university authorities have attempted to compensate for this by arranging a tie-up with the Sports Authority of India, whose sports complex is located a few metres away from the university.  The campus has facilities for indoor sports, and has a gymnasium for use by the staff and students.

The NUJS hosts a number of inter-college events. The Sports Committee of NUJS organises one of the most popular inter-law college events in the country, known as Invicta. Law colleges from across the country participate in this three-day sports festival, held in January every year. The events forming part of the meet are football, cricket, lawn tennis, athletics, table tennis, basketball, volleyball, badminton, chess, carrom, cycling, and throwball. The events are held at venues around the campus, such as the Sports Authority of India Complex, Bengal Tennis Association complex, Salt Lake Stadium (athletics), as well as the campus itself.

Organisation and administration

Schools
NUJS is organised into a number of schools of study, each independent in conception and operation, yet integrated through programmes of teaching, research and extension activities:
 School of Criminal Justice and Administration.
 School of Economic and Business Laws.
 School of Legal Practice and Development.
 School of Private Laws and Comparative Jurisprudence.
 School of Public Law and Governance.
 School of Social Sciences.
 School of Technology, Law and Development.

Research centres
 Centre for Gender research Law.
 Centre for Human Rights and Citizenship Studies
 Centre for WTO Law
 Centre for Financial and Regulatory Governance Studies (cfrgs.nujs.edu)

Endowed chairs
 Ford Foundation Chair on Human Rights
 Ministry of Human Resource Development Chair on Intellectual Property Rights
 Sir Justice Asutosh Mookerjee Chair for Studies in Tradition, Law and Social Transformation in Bengal

The schools and the centres undertake projects which are funded by the government of India, the Department of Economic Affairs, the Union Ministry of Environment and Forests, the Ministry of Home Affairs, the United Nations Development Programme and the Ford Foundation, among others.

Academics

Academic programmes

B.A./B. Sc. LL. B (Hons.)
The admission shall be based exclusively on the performance in the Common Law Admission Test (CLAT). 
However, to qualify for admission, the candidate must have passed the Higher Secondary School Examination (10+2) or an examination equivalent thereof, securing, in aggregate, not less than 50% in all the core subjects and English put together.

The five-year undergraduate course is divided into ten semesters and enrolls 125 students every year.The studants nationality expands mostly to India and South Asia. The programme offers advanced legal education with an emphasis on critical thinking and self-enquiry on the one hand and acquisition of practical skills and knowledge on the other.

LL.M programme
The LL.M degree course is a one-year post graduate course, offering specializations in five streams - (i) International and Comparative law (ii) Corporate and Commercial law (iii) Criminal Law (iv) Intellectual Property Law (v) Law and Technology. This programme is interested in attracting students who either wish to join academia or seek to acquire advanced research skills before joining the legal profession. The admission is based exclusively on the performance in the Common Law Admission Test (CLAT). To qualify for admission, the candidate should have secured LL.B degree or its equivalent from a recognised university, having obtained not less than 55% marks in the aggregate.

The LL.M programme comprises a range of compulsory and optional courses and a dissertation to be completed within two semesters. In the first semester, the students are expected to complete four compulsory courses and one optional course. In the second semester, they have to complete three compulsory courses, one optional course and the LL.M dissertation. These courses are identified by the Post Graduate Council (PGC) in consultation with its Faculty Council. Students are allowed to make their suggestions regarding choices/preferences of any subject or subjects to the PGC which is given due consideration. The dissertation is to be completed by the end of second semester on an approved topic under a Faculty, who is appointed by the PGC. The students are expected to make presentations on their dissertation one month in advance to their submission and also take up independent teaching assignments on certain subjects.

Master of Business Laws
An online Masters in Business Laws degree (2 years) is now being offered by the university. There are multiple specialisations also available.

Research programmes
NUJS offers three research programmes: M.Phil., PhD and LL.D.

The M.Phil. degree programme is designed for legal academics, i.e., students who wish to pursue sustained independent study and research and are planning careers in law teaching.

The Postgraduate Council (PGC) constitutes an advisory committee of three members for each M.Phil. student. Each student will be under the supervision of a faculty advisor. The candidate will be eligible for receipt of the degree only if he/she completes the prescribed requirements of the course within a maximum period of three years.

The PhD and LL.D degrees are two of the most advanced law degrees. The candidates to these degrees are expected to produce a thesis that will constitute a substantial and valuable contribution to legal scholarship. Since the doctoral programme is designed to train law teachers, having the opportunity to practice teaching skills is critical. The candidate is therefore given teaching assignments in addition to making presentations before the faculty community.

Diploma and post-graduate diploma
NUJS, in collaboration with iPleaders, offers a diploma in Entrepreneurship Administration and Business Laws, which has students from 10 different countries. This is university's most successful distance education program, and is available through an android app apart from online Learning Management System. Students in the course include bureaucrats, CEOs, journalists, law firm partners and investment managers.

On 29 April 2013, Vice-chancellor Prof. (Dr.) P. Ishwara Bhat issued a letter of intent for educational institutions, to enter into a MoU with NUJS for its Diploma in Entrepreneurship Administration and Business Laws course. This benefits the partner institution to a greater extent in terms of quality upliftment. It is seen, that by acquiring such practical skillsets at an early stage, students catapult their careers to a farther height.

In November 2014, the university has announced an online Executive Certification Program to train HR professionals, in-house legal counsels, NGO workers, women's rights activists and compliance professionals on sexual harassment prevention and workplace diversity management. The program is titled "Executive Certification on Sexual Harassment Prevention and Workplace Diversity Management".

NUJS used to offer a post-graduate diploma program in business law (in partnership with Rainmaker, the firm which provides logistical support in conducting All India Bar Exam), which has been now discontinued. NUJS offers corporate training course on company law to Larsen & Toubro, one of India's largest engineering and construction conglomerates, Post-Graduate Executive Diploma in Business Management and Law (in partnership with IIM Shillong), Post-Graduate Diploma in Nuclear Law in collaboration with Department of Atomic Energy, space law, human rights law, etc.

Rankings
 
NUJS was ranked second by India Todays "India's Best Colleges 2022: Law". The National Institutional Ranking Framework (NIRF) ranked it fifth in India in the law ranking in 2022.

Faculty

The faculty has included a former governor of Mizoram and CBI director, Dr. A.P. Mukherjee, who taught criminal law, a former judge of the Supreme Court of India Justice Ruma Pal, who was the Ford Foundation Professor of Human Rights, Shamnad Basheer, who held the MHRD IPR Chair and who is well known in the field of intellectual property, a Rhodes scholar, a Commonwealth Scholar, five Fulbright awardees (two visiting professors, one visiting lecturer and two doctoral students), a Felix Scholar and three Chevening Scholars.

Teachers in NUJS have attended Foreign universities such as Columbia University, University of Oxford, Vanderbilt University, London School of Economics and Political Science (LSE), School of Oriental and African Studies (SOAS), University of Nottingham, University of Essex, and Emory University amongst others. Lecturers educated in India have been and/or are alumni of institutions such as NLSIU, NALSAR University of Law, GNLU, Jawaharlal Nehru University, Presidency College, Calcutta, St. Stephen's College, Delhi and, in a recent trend, NUJS itself. The NUJS faculty has published in journals such as European Intellectual Property Review, International Journal of Biotechnology, Journal of World Investment and Trade, Yale Journal of Law and Technology among others.

In addition to lectures by permanent faculty members, the university organises lectures and interactive seminars attended by jurists, lawyers and academicians from India and abroad. NUJS has four major annual lectures: K.C. Basu Endowment Lecture (Law & Economics), Durga Das Basu Memorial Lecture (Constitutional law), Ford Foundation Lecture (Human Rights) and the Convocation Address. Visitors who have delivered other lectures include Lord Robin Auld, Sir Igor Judge, Justice Zakaria Yacoob from the Constitutional Court of South Africa, Justice V. R. Krishna Iyer, Justice M.N. Venkatachaliah, Professor Upendranath Baxi, Ram Jethmalani, Indira Jaising, Vandana Shiva, Bibek Debroy, Jayati Ghosh, Helmut Goerlich, David Nimmer and Manoranjan Mohanty.

Library

The university has a large law library. It also has a social science section journals such as the Harvard and Cambridge Law Reviews, the law reviews of the respective National Law Universities of India, such as the NLSIU, GNLU and NALSAR, the journals of the Indian Law Institute and the Bar Council of India and social science journals such as the Social Scientist, Indian Economic and Social History Review, and the Studies in History are also kept in the library.

NUJS also holds institutional memberships with leading libraries in the cities such as the British Council Library and the American Information Resource Center. Besides this, law students from other universities are encouraged to use the library for research and study.

The NUJS library houses over 20,000 titles and, owing largely to a donation from the estate of the late Justice Durga Das Basu, contains many rare books of historical importance. The reading room has computers linked to major Indian and international online legal databases. In addition to the main library, each school of the university has its library.

Student life

Student Juridical Association
The student body of the university is known as the Student Juridical Association (SJA).  The SJA has an elected president and vice-president, along with two administrative office bearers, the administrative secretary and the treasurer.  The SJA has an executive council which is constituted by representatives from the various student committees of the SJA (There are 13 SJA committees in total) and an elected class representative from each of the five batches of students. The student committees of the SJA are committees for encouraging, organising and playing an administrative role in extracurricular activities within the student body.  Such committees include the Magazine Committee, Moot Court Society, Cultural Committee, Literary and Debating Society, Sports Committee, Law and Contemporary Affairs Society, Alternative Dispute Resolution Society, Society for Advancement of Criminal Justice etc.

The university through SJA publishes its own student-run peer reviewed law journals, the bi-annual Journal of Indian Law and Society". Another peer-reviewed journal launched by the university in 2011 is the Journal of Telecommunication and Broadcasting Law.

The NUJS Law Review is the official publication of NUJS and is funded directly by the university. It is independent of the SJA and its publications. It has a dedicated team of six editors chosen from amongst the students of NUJS. Professor M.P. Singh is the founding editor-in-chief of NUJS Law Review, which is India's only quarterly law journal published by a national law school. Conceived by Professor Singh himself, the NUJS Law Review prides itself on its unique model of functioning with an in-house team of authors who are rigorously groomed to undertake editing and managerial responsibilities of NUJS Law Review''.

Legal Aid Society

The Legal Aid Society has undertaken the following categories of activities:
 Legal Aid Clinic and Counseling: The Legal Aid Clinic has been set up as a permanent body to provide free legal advice and resolution of disputes without long drawn and expensive litigation. This is done by providing legal and para-legal assistance. The clinic is presided over by the faculty advisor, Shri N. Konar, a former judge. Assistance is also provided by other former judges in the faculty. The clinic has been functional since 9 November 2002 and has tendered advice to several cases.
 Human Rights and Public Education: For empowering people through legal education and instilling in them consciousness about their rights and duties.  This is done through field visits in semi-urban and rural areas as well as publicised seminars and workshops within the university itself.
 Youth for Social Justice: A social awareness program that targets young people with the objective of ingraining in impressionable minds a sense of social justice.
 Law Enforcement Assistance: This subcommittee works with law enforcement authorities such as the police, Government, pollution control board, for providing an interface to people to promote legal awareness and law-enforcement.
 Para Legal Services and Training: The purpose of this activity is to build relationships with other agencies that work in the field such as NGOs, to facilitate exchange of information.  The Society seeks to provide training and services in the form of documental consultancy and research to these agencies.
 Public Interest Advocacy Support services: In the form of documentation, obtaining empirical data and other allied research are to be provided for public advocacy of popular concerns and public interest litigations.
 Lok Adalat and ADR assistance: As part of its goal to encourage alternate dispute resolution, the Legal Aid Society organises Lok Adalats in association with the W.B. Legal Aid Authority.  Till date one Lok Adalat, specially for women was held in November 2003.

Mooting achievements

Students have won numerous encomiums at national and international Moot Court competitions. In 2003, NUJS became the only Indian and second Asian college to win the Willem C. Vis International Commercial Arbitration Moot, held at Vienna. In 2005 and 2017, the University Moot team won the Willem C. Vis (East) International Commercial Arbitration Moot, which is held each year in Hong Kong.  In 2013, NUJS won the Pan Asian Award at the Vis (East) Competition.
In the field of international trade law, NUJS has twice won the ELSA Moot Court Competition conducted by the World Trade Organisation (WTO), first in 2010 and next in 2015. NUJS is the only Indian law school to have won this competition since its inception. In 2005, NUJS also emerged as winners at the Stetson International Environmental Law Moot Court Competition at Stetson University Law School in Gulfport, Florida, USA after winning the India rounds organised by Surana and Surana Moots. In 2020, NUJS won the Willem C. Vis International Commercial Arbitration Moot, which was held online due to the COVID-19 pandemic. With this, NUJS became the only Indian university to win the moot twice.

References

External links

Universities in Kolkata
Law schools in West Bengal
Educational institutions established in 1999
1999 establishments in West Bengal
National Law Universities